The 2022 Drake Bulldogs football team represented Drake University as a member of the Pioneer Football League (PFL) during the 2022 NCAA Division I FCS football season. The Bulldogs were led by fourth-year head coach Todd Stepsis and played their home games at Drake Stadium in Des Moines, Iowa.

Previous season

The Bulldogs finished the 2021 season with a record 2–9, 1–7 in PFL play to finish in a tie for ninth place.

Preseason

Preseason coaches' poll

Preseason All-PFL teams

Schedule

Game summaries

at No. 1 North Dakota State

Missouri S&T

at Idaho

Marist

at Dayton

San Diego

at St. Thomas (MN)

Davidson

at Stetson

Butler

at Valparaiso

References

Drake
Drake Bulldogs football seasons
Drake Bulldogs football